Éxitos Originales (Spanish "Original Hits") may refer to:

14 Éxitos Originales
Para Ti 14 Exitos Originales, a compilation album released by Juan Gabriel in 1988

20 Éxitos Originales
20 Éxitos Originales (Enanitos Verdes album), 1995
20 Éxitos Originales, Azúcar Moreno 2005
20 Éxitos Originales, Leo Dan 2006
20 Éxitos Originales, José José 2005
20 Éxitos Originales, Dark Latin Groove 2005
20 Éxitos Originales, Willy Chirino 2006
20 Éxitos Originales, Desde El Principio 2005
20 Éxitos Originales, Lucero discography 2005
20 Éxitos Originales, Soda Stereo 2005
20 Éxitos Originales, Johnny Ventura 2006
20 Éxitos Originales, Fey discography 2005
20 Éxitos Originales, Jeanette (singer) 2005

See also
Éxitos (disambiguation)